John Michael Phillips (born February 4, 1975) is an American lawyer, consumer and civil rights advocate, and legal commentator. He is licensed to practice law in Florida, New York, Georgia, Alabama, Texas, Oklahoma, Illinois and Washington, DC. Phillips has been lead counsel in numerous nationally reported cases. He successfully represented Lucy McBath and Ron Davis after the shooting of Jordan Davis in Jacksonville, Florida. He prevailed as lead counsel for Omarosa Manigault Newman in litigation filed against her by Donald J. Trump for President, Inc. As a result, the Campaign was assessed Phillips’s legal fees and costs, totaling over $1.3 Million and agreed to invalidate all of the Campaign's NDAs. He also is lead counsel for Joseph Maldonado-Passage, also known as Joe Exotic, and is featured in four episodes of the second season of the Netflix show Tiger King.

Early life and education

Phillips was born and raised in Mobile, Alabama, before moving to Jacksonville, Florida in 2001. He received a BA from the University of Alabama in Political Science and Criminal Justice in 1997. He attended the University of Alabama School of Law, receiving a JD in 2000. He subsequently became licensed to practice law in Florida, New York, Georgia, Alabama, Texas, Oklahoma, Illinois and Washington, DC and is also licensed before the United States Supreme Court.

Political life and civic career

In 2015, Phillips was nominated by the Mayor of Jacksonville to the City's Human Rights Commission. Not without controversy, a Brunswick, Georgia pastor once asked the Mayor to force Phillips to resign his position, claiming he was biased, saying Phillips "has shown he cannot be a fair person and serve on the city's Human Rights Commission". The mayor's office sided with Phillips and he remained on the Commission. On November 14, 2017, Phillips resigned from the Commission in order to relieve any perceived conflict before filing multiple civil rights lawsuits against the City of Jacksonville. During one of those lawsuits, during a deposition of the elected Sheriff, Phillips offered to settle the case if he apologized for the police brutality on video. The Sheriff obliged. 

In 2016, he was named one of the 29 most influential people in Jacksonville, Florida by Folio Weekly. He is very active in community outreach.

On January 10, 2023, Phillips announced he was running for city council, In Jacksonville's District 7, which includes downtown and the sports complex.  In his announcement, Phillips said, “It’s time for a change. We must bring compassion and action to a city which needs more unity and less crime.” He is kicking off his campaign Wednesday at 3:30 p.m. at his law office, Phillips & Hunt, in downtown Jacksonville.

Legal career

Phillips started his career as a civil litigation defense attorney, defending companies like Coca-Cola, Hertz and State Farm from injury claims. After over 8 years with his firm, he worked alongside John Morgan and represented victims of traumatic injuries. In 2011, Phillips founded his own law office. It has since expanded to a multi-state practice. He is known as a preeminent civil rights lawyer, wrongful death lawyer, sports lawyer, personal injury lawyer, commercial litigation lawyer and criminal defense lawyer.

Jordan Davis shooting

In 2012, Phillips was hired by Ron Davis and Lucy McBath after the shooting of Jordan Davis by Michael Dunn. The murder stemmed from an argument over loud music on November 23, 2012. Police say 45-year-old Michael Dunn fired 10 times at a vehicle in which 17-year-old Jordan Davis was a passenger just after 7:30 p.m. in Jacksonville, Florida. Michael Dunn was convicted of Jordan Davis's murder after two trials and remains behind bars. Jordan's death made news around the nation much like the murder case of Trayvon Martin. Phillips' perspective and a photo with the family appeared in Rolling Stone magazine in 2013.

Although Joy Reid once described Phillips as "a white, lifelong Republican with an Alabama drawl, who like 1.5 million Floridians, has a concealed carry permit," he is frequently praised for his fight for equal rights and is often quoted as saying, he's "not Republican, not Democrat, but reasonable." Phillips's experiences led to a TEDx speech, which has amassed over 300,000 views. Additionally, he received a feature by BET online, spotlighting Phillips as a civil rights advocate.

On January 10, 2023, Phillips announced a run for City Council.  In his announcement, Phillips said, “It’s time for a change. We must bring compassion and action to a city which needs more unity and less crime.”

Featured in Abigail Disney documentary: The Armor of Light

Phillips still remains close with the Davis / McBath family and uses the example of Jordan Davis to encourage people to be more civil with each other. His family was featured in an Emmy award winning documentary by Abigail Disney, the daughter of Roy O. Disney and niece of Walt Disney. The movie is called The Armor of Light and features Phillips' story alongside his client Lucy McBath and Reverend Rob Schenck. The film premiered at Tribeca and went on to receive much acclaim. In 2017, it won an Emmy Award for best "Outstanding Social Interest Documentary."

Lawyer for individuals associated with Tiger King

Tiger King was a docuseries which aired in 2020 on Netflix. It featured the contentious relationship between Joseph Allen Maldonado-Passage, also known as Joe Exotic and Carole Baskin, as well as the disappearance of Carole Baskin's ex-husband Don Lewis.

Phillips was hired in July 2020 to represent Don Lewis’s daughters along with his former assistant Anne McQueen. He filed a lawsuit against Carole Baskin and others in early August seeking to obtain more information about the disappearance of Don Lewis and amended it to assert an action for defamation on behalf of Anne McQueen, which is pending. To promote information gathering, the family and Phillips ran a commercial during Baskin's appearance on Dancing with the Stars, which went viral. He no longer represents the family of Don Lewis.

After seeing Phillips' efforts on the case, Phillips and his firm were contacted and retained by Joe Exotic. Phillips serves as lead criminal and civil litigation counsel. “We’re going to seek a new trial, and justice in the criminal and civil courts,” Philips said after flying to visit Maldonado-Passage at Fort Worth’s Federal Medical Center.

Donald Trump v. Omarosa Manigault Newman

On August 18, 2018, it was announced that Phillips and his firm are representing Omarosa Manigault Newman in both arbitration and litigation arising out of her employment with Donald Trump, both at his political campaign and presidency. After Newman published her book, Unhinged, Phillips attended her initial book tour and subsequently picked up boxes of her belongings at the White House.

Phillips defeated former President Donald J. Trump and his Campaign's efforts to enforce a nondisclosure agreement against Omarosa Manigault Newman, the former White House aide and a star on “The Apprentice” who wrote a tell-all book about serving in his administration. Phillips told the New York Times, "It’s over. We’ve won in Donald Trump and the Trump campaign’s chosen forum.”. In the decision by the American Arbitration Association dated September 24, 2021, the Arbitrator held, “Upon consideration of the parties’ submissions, the Arbitrator hereby grants Respondent’s Summary Judgment Motion declaring the Agreement invalid under New York contract law.". Phillips now seeks attorney fees from the Campaign.

First Amendment and trademark litigation

Although he is known for his work in personal injury and wrongful death cases, he stopped George Zimmerman when he was trying to sell his client's copyrighted photograph of notorious prosecutor Angela Corey as a painting  and also successfully represented an Orlando man who made "Left Shark" 3-D figurines against claims of copyright infringement by singer Katy Perry. Phillips also represents Wonkette, an American online magazine of topical and political gossip, and its publisher Rebecca Schoenkopf. They were sued by Larry Klayman, after Wonkette published satirical articles mocking Klayman's legal and personal woes.

Howard S. Schneider pediatric abuse cases

Phillips handled was the nationally reported case of Jacksonville pediatric dentist Howard S. Schneider. Howard Schneider was charged in a scheme to defraud Medicaid, but the allegations against him also included abuse and performing unnecessary dentistry on children, telling parents that he needed to work on one tooth and extracting several. Parents also allege that he unnecessarily restrained children with the controversial papoose board. Although he was found incompetent to stand trial, he lost his license to practice and much of his status in the community and a confidential settlement was reached.

Phillips was interviewed on Nancy Grace, Anderson Cooper, Nightline, Crime Watch Daily, and others about the case.

Controversial civil rights verdict

Another notable case includes Gregory Hill v. Ft. Pierce Police Department (where a man was shot by police through his closed garage door), It resulted in a controversial $4 jury verdict. The $4 verdict was reversed by the 11th Circuit Court of Appeals after Phillips argued the trial judge erred by allowing in inappropriate evidence. It will be retried.

Record verdict on behalf of Kalil McCoy

On January 15, 2019, Phillips and his firm received a jury verdict of $495,123,680.00, the largest known jury verdict in northeast Florida and one of the largest wrongful death verdicts in the country. Kalil McCoy, of Jacksonville, Florida, was shot in the head by Frederick Lee Wade, 19, while they rode in a car with four other friends, after an argument about opening a window. McCoy’s friends then dumped her body in a wooded area and lied about what happened. Fox News reported the victim's mother mother, Lynette Roebuck, saying, "that while the judgment won’t bring her daughter back, it acknowledges the pain her family has suffered for seven years." This was on top of another prior settlement in the case.

Estate of Christopher “YNW Juvy” Thomas, Jr. versus Jamell "YNW Melly" Demons

Christopher Thomas Jr., and Anthony Williams were shot and killed Oct. 26, 2018, in South Florida according to the Miramar Police Department. The men were last seen leaving in a car with Jamell Demons, aka YNW Melly, and Cortlen Henry, aka YNW Bortlen. Miramar police said an investigation concluded that Demons shot and killed Williams and Thomas. Henry was arrested in Texas and extradited to Broward County on Feb. 12, 2019. Demons turned himself in to officials in Broward County on Feb. 13, 2019.

Phillips filed a wrongful death lawsuit on behalf of the family of Christopher Thomas, Jr., on Oct. 30 2020, and claims that “damages are in the millions or tens of millions of dollars or more.” The exact amount, Phillips explained, will be left up to a jury to decide.

At a hearing in the criminal case in Aug. 2019, the State of Florida prosecutor, Broward County Assistant State Attorney Kristine Bradley, played a video that she says was found on Melly’s phone. It was recorded one month to the day after Juvy and Sakchaser were killed. In the hearing, she called it “a video of Mr. Demons admitting to shooting two individuals in the head.” In the video, Melly says, “There’s no regret for the shit that I did for that n***a to die,” and then, according to Bradley’s description, puts a pen he’s holding to his head as if it’s a gun, mimes pulling the trigger, and throws up a Bloods gang sign. Then Melly continues: “Both of them never say when.”.

Phillips attempted to get a copy of the video, and Melly and Bortlen’s lawyers motioned to block its release. The publicity from it, they said, could deny their clients a fair trial by causing “pretrial prejudice.” “It seems to me that it's both a prevention of public records from being public, and a gag order back door,” Phillips says. To him, Melly’s team mentioning his social media posts about the case is “hypocritical,” given that Melly, Bortlen, and others are posting as well. As a result of accepting this case, Phillips states he has been the victim of death threats and harassment, “The death threats, the urinating on my mother's grave comments, they're hurtful. We report them, we investigate them. My family hates to see them. But it's a part of what we do.”.

Other high-profile cases

Additionally, Phillips has handled several other nationally reported cases, including a woman was run over while sunbathing on Daytona Beach, for which he was interviewed on The Today Show. Good Morning America also filmed and broadcast portions of this trial in 2014, where Phillips can be seen hugging his client after a $2.6 million verdict. See also Aviana Bailey v. Daytona Beach Police (where Bailey was shot by Daytona Beach Police while a passenger in a vehicle).

Awards and recognition

Just during the last few years, Phillips and his office have been named as: Legal Elite, Florida Trend Magazine, SuperLawyer, by Florida Super Lawyers, Litigator Award, Trial Lawyers Board of Regents, Top 100 Trial Lawyer, by the National Trial Lawyers Association, Top 40 Under 40, by the American Society of Legal Advocates, AV – Preeminent (the highest rating obtainable), by peers according to Martindale-Hubbell, 10 / 10, by Avvo, "One of 29 Most Influential People in Jacksonville," by Folio Weekly, "Best Lawyer," by readers of the Folio Weekly, "Righteous Crusader," by readers of the Folio Weekly, "Attorney of the Month (with Photo on the Cover)," by Attorney at Law Magazine of Florida, "Attorney of the Month (with Photo on the Cover)," by Attorney at Law Magazine of Georgia, "#1 Lawyer," by readers of Void Magazine, "Face of Justice in the 904," by 904 Magazine, "Top Lawyer," by 904 Magazine, "Company with Heart," by 904 Magazine, "Best Lawyer," by Jacksonville Magazine, "Who's Who in Law," by Ponte Vedra Recorder, and many others.

Speeches and presentations

Since 2009, Phillips has spoken hundreds of times on various legal topics. He gave a TEDx talk which has been viewed over 300,000 times. He also has spoken internationally in Ghana and on the BBC and to groups at Howard University and before the NAACP.

Television and radio personality

Phillips has appeared on NBC's The Today Show, MSNBC, HLN, BBC, Al Jazeera, RT TV, TV ONE and regularly appears on other national media outlets as a legal correspondent. He is a recurring guest and legal analyst on HLN (CNN's Headline News program). Phillips covered the George Zimmerman verdict live from Sanford, Florida for HLN  and has covered other high profile cases such as Jodi Arias and Casey Anthony for national media.

From 2011 to 2013, Phillips hosted a podcast, which was aired regionally in Jacksonville, Florida called Courts & Sports. He still regularly appears on the morning radio show Lex and Terry. He represented the duo in 2012 and frequently has a call in segment where listeners ask Phillips for legal advice.

Publisher
Phillips is listed as the publisher of the 33 year-old news publication Folio Weekly. It was acquired by an entity known as Boldland Press, Inc., which Phillips is listed as controlling on SunBiz, Florida's corporate record search engine. Phillips also is listed as an owner of another publishing company PDJ Publishing, Inc.

Personal life
Phillips resides in Jacksonville, Florida, is married and has three sons.

References

External links
 John Phillips Law Office Web Site
 John Phillips Official Web Site

1975 births
20th-century American lawyers
21st-century American lawyers
American legal scholars
American television personalities
Male television personalities
Florida lawyers
Living people
University of Alabama School of Law alumni
Tiger King